Erika S. Zavaleta is an American professor of ecology and evolutionary biology at the University of California, Santa Cruz. Zavaleta is recognized for her research focusing on topics including plant community ecology, conservation practices for terrestrial ecosystems, and impacts of community dynamics on ecosystem functions.

Early life and education 
Zavaleta was born in New York. Both her parents immigrated to the United States to study; her father from Bolivia and her mother from India. Zavaleta spent time playing outside from a young age, influencing her early interest in science. She earned a Bachelors and Masters in Anthropology at Stanford University. For her thesis, Zavaleta studied the evolution of waterfowl conservation in the Yukon-Kuskokwim Delta with advisers William Durham and  Donald Kennedy. Zavaleta earned her Ph.D. from Stanford University in biological services. Her doctoral mentors were Hal Mooney and Chris Field, with her dissertation focused on examining plant diversity and ecosystem functioning in a California grassland as influenced by climate and atmospheric changes.

Career and research 
Zavaleta is a Howard Hughes Medical Institute Professor of Ecology and Evolutionary Biology at the University of California Santa Cruz (UCSC).  She also serves as the Faculty Director for the UCSC Doris Duke Conservation Scholars Program, which is a conservation leadership program supporting a diverse group of undergraduate college students. In 2018, Zavaleta founded and serves as the faculty director of the Center to Advance Mentored, Inquiry-Based Opportunities (CAMINO) at UCSC to promote inclusive and accessible research experiences, and provide resources and mentoring for students interested in the ecology and conservation fields.

From 2001-2003, Zavaleta was a David H. Smith Conservation Research Fellow of The Nature Conservancy

Zavaleta is known for her research in environmental change at both global and regional scales, ecology and biodiversity, ecosystems functions, and conservation practice. Projects include seeking to understand how global climate changes affect terrestrial ecosystems, analyzing ecosystem stewardship and effective conservation practice in response to global climate changes, and studying the impacts of biodiversity loss. Zavaleta's paper Consequences of Changing Biodiversity examines the impact of human caused extinctions in decreasing the resiliency of ecosystems and thus the services humans can gain from these ecosystems. In Biodiversity Management in the Face of Climate Change: A Review of 22 Years of Recommendations, Zavaleta reviews literature addressing adaptation to climate change, and identifies trends to provide recommendations for conservation management. Zavaleta analyses secondary impacts in ecosystems of the eradication of invasive species to provide recommendations to prevent adverse unintended impacts in her paper Viewing Invasive Species Removal in a Whole-Ecosystem Context.

Awards and honors 
 2021 Ecological Society of America Commitment to Human Diversity in Ecology. Zavaleta was recognized by the Ecological Society of America for her contributions toward increasing the diversity of future ecologists through mentoring, teaching, and outreach.
 2018 Ecological Society of America Fellow. Zavaleta was recognized by the Ecological Society of America for her contributions to research and teaching in her field.
 2017 Howard Hughes Medical Institute Professor. This award recognizes Zavaleta's effective engagement of students in research, and provides funding for programming to increase accessibility of science.
 2017 Commonwealth Club of California 86th Annual California Book Awards Gold Metal. Zavaleta, along with Harold Mooney, were recognized in the Contribution to Publishing category for co-authoring the textbook Ecosystems of California.
 2017 American Publishers' Association Award, Excellence in Physical Sciences and Mathematics, Excellence in Environmental Science. These awards recognize Zavaleta and Mooney's Ecosystems of California as outstanding scholarly work.
2008 Ecological Society of America Sustainability Science Award. Zavaleta was recognized as a co-author of the paper Policy strategies to address sustainability of Alaskan boreal forests in response to a directionally changing climate, as a paper integrating social and ecological sciences having notable impact contributing to ecosystem and regional sustainability.

Publications 
Zavaleta has published an extensive amount of work, including over 68 peer-reviewed journal articles, 1 book, 14 chapters in books, and 4 non-academic specific reports as of 2017.

 2000   Chapin, F. S. III, E. S. Zavaleta, V. T. Eviner, R. L. Naylor, P. M. Vitousek, O. E. Sala, H. L. Reynolds, D. U. Hooper, M. Mack, S. E. Diaz, S. E. Hobbie, and S. Lavorel. Consequences of changing biodiversity. Nature 405: 234–242.
 2001   Zavaleta, E. S., R. Hobbs, and H. Mooney. Viewing invasive species removal in a whole-ecosystem context.  Trends in Ecology and Evolution 16(8): 454–459.
 2002   M. R. Shaw, E. S. Zavaleta, N. R. Chiariello, E.E. Cleland, H. A. Mooney, C. B. Field .  Grassland Responses to Global Environmental Changes Suppressed by Elevated CO2. Science 298: 1987–90.
 2002   M. R. Shaw, E. S. Zavaleta, N. R. Chiariello, E.E. Cleland, H. A. Mooney, C. B. Field .  Grassland Responses to Global Environmental Changes Suppressed by Elevated CO2. Science 298: 1987–90.
 2004   Zavaleta, E. S., and K. B. Hulvey.  Realistic species losses disproportionately reduce resistance to biological invaders.  Science 306:1175-1177.
 2008   D. Lindenmeyer, R. Hobbs, R. Montague-Drake, J. Alexandra, A. Bennett, M. Burgman, P. Cale, A. Calhoun, V. Cramer,  P. Cullen, D. Driscoll, L. Fahrig, J. Fischer, J. Franklin, Y. Haila, M. Hunter, P. Gibbons, S. Lake, G. Luck, C. MacGregor, S. McIntyre, R. Mac Nally, A. Manning, J. Miller, H. Mooney, R. Noss, H. Possingham, D. Saunders, Fiona Schmiegelow, M. Scott, D. Simberloff, T. Sisk, G. Tabor, B. Walker, J. Wiens, J. Woinarski and E. Zavaleta.  A Checklist for Ecological Management of Landscapes for Conservation.  Ecology Letters 11: 78–91.
2008   H. P. Jones, B. R. Tershy, E. S. Zavaleta, D. A. Croll, B. S. Keitt, M. E. Finklestein, G. R. Howald. Review of the global severity of the effects of invasive rats on seabirds.  Conservation Biology 22:16-26.
2008   Funk, J., E. Cleland, K. Suding and E. Zavaleta.  Restoration through re-assembly: plant traits and invasion. Trends in Ecology and Evolution 23: 695–703.
2011   Forest Isbell, Vincent Calcagno, Andy Hector, John Connolly, W. Stanley Harpole, Peter B. Reich, Michael Scherer-Lorenzen, Bernhard Schmid, David Tilman, Jasper van Ruijven, Alexandra Weigelt, Brian J. Wilsey, Erika S. Zavaleta, Michel Loreau. High plant diversity is needed to maintain ecosystem services. Nature 477: 199–202.
2012   S. Naeem, J. E. Duffy, and E. S. Zavaleta. The functions of biological diversity in an age of extinction. Science 336: 1401–1406.

Personal life 
Zavaleta has four children with her spouse Bernie. Her family splits time between Telluride, Colorado and California.

References 

American people of Indian descent
American people of Bolivian descent
Stanford University alumni
University of California, Santa Cruz faculty
Fellows of the Ecological Society of America
Living people
Year of birth missing (living people)